The women's triple jump event at the 2003 All-Africa Games was held on October 12.

Results

References

Triple
2003